Asad Khan (also Romanized as Asad Khān) is a village in Elhayi Rural District, in the Central District of Ahvaz County, Khuzestan Province, Iran. At the 2006 census, its population was 102, in 17 families.

References 

Populated places in Ahvaz County